State Route 175 (SR 175) is a  state highway in Perry County.  The southern terminus of the route is at its junction with SR 14 and SR 183 approximately three miles northeast of Marion.  The northern terminus of the route is at its junction with SR 5 approximately one mile south of Heiberger, the birthplace of Coretta Scott King.

Route description
The north–south route is aligned along a two-lane road in rural Perry County, part of the Black Belt of west-central Alabama.  The route serves as an eastern bypass around Marion for motorists driving from westbound State Route 14 towards northbound State Route 5.

Major intersections

References

175
Transportation in Perry County, Alabama